The 3,000 Mile Chase is a 1977 NBC action television film directed by Russ Mayberry and starring Glenn Ford and Cliff De Young.

Premise
Secret courier Matt Considine (Cliff De Young) accepts the mission to escort chief witness Dvorak (Glenn Ford)  and his wife from San Francisco to a trial in New York. They have to cover 3,000 dangerous miles, because the drug mob wants to kill them at any price.

Cast

References
Movies on TV and Video Cassette 1989-1990 by Steven H. Scheuer.

Movies made for television: the telefeature and the mini-series, 1964–1984, by Alvin H. Marill.

External links 

1970s English-language films
1977 television films
1977 films
American action television films
NBC network original films
American action drama films
Films directed by Russ Mayberry
1970s American films